Koiak 12 - Coptic Calendar - Koiak 14

The thirteenth day of the Coptic month of Koiak, the fourth month of the Coptic year. On a common year, this day corresponds to December 9, of the Julian Calendar, and December 22 of the Gregorian Calendar. This day falls in the Coptic season of Peret, the season of emergence. This day falls in the Nativity Fast.

Commemorations

Saints 

 The martyrdom of Saint Barsanuphius, the Monk 
 The departure of Pope Mark VIII, the one-hundred and eighth Patriarch of the See of Saint Mark 
 The departure of Saint Aprakius 
 The departure of Saint Elias the Anchorite

Other commemorations 

 The commemoration of the Honorable Archangel Raphael
 The consecration of the Church of Saint Misael the Anchorite

References 

Days of the Coptic calendar